Italy competed at the 1936 Summer Olympics in Berlin, Germany. 244 competitors, 228 men and 16 women, took part in 99 events in 17 sports.

Medals

Gold 
 Ondina Valla - Track and field, women's 80 m Hurdles
 Ulderico Sergo - Boxing, a series of 53.5 kg
 Giulio Gaudini - Fencing, men's foil
 Franco Riccardi - Fencing – Men's épée
 Giulio Gaudini, Gioacchino Guaragna, Gustavo Marzi, Giorgio Bocchino, Manlio Di Rosa and Ciro Verratti - Fencing, men's foil team competition
 Saverio Ragno, Alfredo Pezzana, Giancarlo Cornaggia-Medici, Edoardo Mangiarotti, Franco Riccardi and Giancarlo Brusati - Fencing, men's kalvan team competition
 Bruno Venturini, Alfredo Foni, Pietro Rava, Giuseppe Baldo, Achille Piccini, Ugo Locatelli, Annibale Frossi, Libero Marchini, Sergio Bertoni, Carlo Biagi, Francesco Gabriotti, Giulio Cappelli, Alfonso Negro and Luigi Scarabello - Football, men
 Giovanni Reggio, Bruno Bianchi, Luigi De Manincor, Domenico Mordini, Luigi Poggi and Enrico Poggi - Sailing, 8MR

Silver 
 Mario Lanzi - Track and field, men's 800 m
 Orazio Mariani, Gianni Caldana, Elio Ragni and Tullio Gonnelli - Track and field, men's 4 × 100 m relay
 Almiro Bergamo, Guido Santin and Luciano Negrini - Rowing, Men pair cox
 Guglielmo Del Bimbo, Dino Barsotti, Oreste Grossi, Enzo Bartolini, Mario Checcacci, Dante Secchi, Ottorino Quaglierini, Enrico Garzelli and Cesare Milani - Rowing, men's eight
 Gavino Matta - Boxing, a series of 50.8 kg
 Severino Rigoni, Bianco Bianchi, Mario Gentili and Armando Latini - Cycling, Men's Team Pursuit
 Saverio Ragno - Fencing, men épée
 Gustavo Marzi - Fencing, men's sabre
 Vincenzo Pinton, Giulio Gaudini, Aldo Masciotta, Gustavo Marzi, Aldo Montano and Athos Tanzini - Fencing, men's sabre team competition

Bronze 
 Luigi Beccali - Track and field, men's 1500 m
 Giorgio Oberweger - Track and field, men's discus throw
 Giorgio Bocchino - Fencing, men's foil
 Giancarlo Cornaggia-Medici - Fencing, men épée
 Silvano Abba - Modern Pentathlon, men's individual competition

Athletics

Results

Basketball

First Round

Second Round

Third Round

Fourth Round

5th–8th place semifinals

7th place game

Men's Team Competition
Team Roster
Enrico Cestelli
Galeazzo Dondi
Livio Franceschini
Emilio Giosetti
Giancarlo Marinelli
Sergio Paganella
Egidio Premiani
Gino Basso

Boxing

Canoeing

K-1 1000 metres
 Elio Sasso Sant

K-1 10000 metres
 Elio Sasso Sant

Cycling

Eleven cyclists, all men, represented Italy in 1936.

Individual road race
 Pierino Favalli
 Glauco Servadei
 Corrado Ardizzoni
 Elio Bavutti

Team road race
 Pierino Favalli
 Glauco Servadei
 Corrado Ardizzoni
 Elio Bavutti

Sprint
 Benedetto Pola

Time trial
 Benedetto Pola

Tandem
 Carlo Legutti
 Bruno Loatti

Team pursuit
 Bianco Bianchi
 Mario Gentili
 Armando Latini
 Severino Rigoni

Diving

Equestrian

Fencing

16 fencers, all men, represented Italy in 1936.

Men's foil
 Giulio Gaudini
 Giorgio Bocchino
 Gioacchino Guaragna

Men's team foil
 Manlio Di Rosa, Giulio Gaudini, Gioacchino Guaragna, Gustavo Marzi, Giorgio Bocchino, Ciro Verratti

Men's épée
 Franco Riccardi
 Saverio Ragno
 Giancarlo Cornaggia-Medici

Men's team épée
 Edoardo Mangiarotti, Giancarlo Cornaggia-Medici, Saverio Ragno, Franco Riccardi, Giancarlo Brusati, Alfredo Pezzana

Men's sabre
 Gustavo Marzi
 Vincenzo Pinton
 Giulio Gaudini

Men's team sabre
 Giulio Gaudini, Gustavo Marzi, Aldo Masciotta, Vincenzo Pinton, Aldo Montano, Athos Tanzini

Football

Men's Team Squad
Bruno Venturini
Gianni Ferrero
Alfredo Foni
Pietro Rava
Giuseppe Baldo
Achille Piccini
Ugo Locatelli
Annibale Frossi
Libero Marchini
Luigi Scarabello
Carlo Biagi
Giulio Cappelli
Sergio Bertoni
Alfonso Negro
Francesco Gabriotti
Adolfo Giuntoli
Mario Nicolini
Carlo Girometta
Sandro Puppo
Corrado Tamietti
Paolo Vannucci
Lamberto Petri

Gymnastics

16 gymnasts, 8 men and 8 women, represented Italy in 1936.

Men's team
 Egidio Armelloni
 Oreste Capuzzo
 Danilo Fioravanti
 Savino Guglielmetti
 Romeo Neri
 Otello Ternelli
 Franco Tognini
 Nicolò Tronci

Women's team
 Anna Avanzini
 Vittoria Avanzini
 Clara Bimbocci
 Ebore Canella
 Pina Cipriotto
 Elda Cividino
 Gianna Guaita
 Carmela Toso

Modern pentathlon

Three male pentathlete represented Italy in 1936.

 Silvano Abbà
 Ugo Ceccarelli
 Franco Orgera

Rowing

Italy had 22 rowers participate in five out of seven rowing events in 1936.

 Men's single sculls
 Riccardo Steinleitner

 Men's coxed pair
 Almiro Bergamo
 Guido Santin
 Luciano Negrini (cox)

 Men's coxless four
 Antonio Ghiardello
 Luigi Luxardo
 Aldo Pellizzoni
 Francesco Pittaluga

 Men's coxed four
 Valerio Perentin
 Giliante D'Este
 Nicolò Vittori
 Umberto Vittori
 Renato Petronio (cox)

 Men's eight
 Guglielmo Del Bimbo
 Dino Barsotti
 Oreste Grossi
 Enzo Bartolini
 Mario Checcacci
 Dante Secchi
 Ottorino Quaglierini
 Enrico Garzelli
 Cesare Milani (cox)

Sailing

Shooting

Nine shooters represented Italy in 1936.

25 m rapid fire pistol
 Walter Boninsegni
 Bruno Giacconi
 Michelangelo Borriello

50 m pistol
 Stefano Margotti
 Giancarlo Boriani
 Ugo Pistolesi

50 m rifle, prone
 Mario Zorzi
 Carlo Varetto
 Lodovico Nulli

Weightlifting

Wrestling

Art competitions

References

External links
Official Olympic Reports
International Olympic Committee results database
 

Nations at the 1936 Summer Olympics
1936
1936 in Italian sport